The Canon EOS 600D is an 18.0 megapixel digital single-lens reflex camera, released by Canon on 7 February 2011. It is known as the EOS Kiss X5 in Japan and the EOS Rebel T3i in America. The 600D is the second Canon EOS camera with an articulating LCD screen and supersedes the 550D, although the earlier model was not discontinued until June 2012, when the successor of the 600D, the 650D, was announced.

Feature list
 18.0 effective megapixel APS-C CMOS sensor
 Full HD 1080p video recording at 24/25/30 frame/s
 HD 720p video recording at 50/60 frame/s
 3–10× Digital Zoom in video recording (available only in 1080p).
 One reviewer concluded that this feature takes a 1920×1080 crop from the middle of the sensor frame for the "3×" zoom, but was unable to confirm this with Canon. This feature has not been included in any subsequent models of the Rebel line, or in the EOS M mirrorless camera (although in that model, it can be implemented with Magic Lantern open source software), but returned with the 2013 release of the EOS 70D.
 DIGIC 4 image processor
 14-bit analog to digital signal conversion
  Vari-angle 3:2 aspect ratio LCD articulating screen.
 The screen, inherited from the mid-range 60D, is also notable in that its aspect ratio matches that of the sensor—a rare feature among DSLRs at the time of introduction.
 Live view mode
 Built in flash with Speedlite wireless multi-flash support
 9-point AF with centre cross-type sensor sensitive at f/2.8
 Four metering modes, using 63 zones: spot, partial, center-weighted average, and evaluative metering.
 Highlight tone priority
 EOS integrated cleaning system
 sRGB and Adobe RGB colour spaces
 ISO 100–6,400 expandable to 12,800
 Continuous drive up to 3.7 frame/s (34 images (JPEG), 6 images (raw))
 SD, SDHC, and SDXC memory card file storage
 RAW and large JPEG simultaneous recording
 Eye-Fi support
 USB 2.0, HDMI interface
 LP-E8 battery

Video
As with many DSLRs (and unlike the SLT cameras), the 600D lacks continuous auto-focus while filming video. To keep a moving subject in focus the user must either trigger the auto-focus (as when shooting stills), or track the subject's motion manually.

Successor
The successor of Canon EOS 600D was the Canon EOS 650D, equipped with a newly developed Hybrid CMOS sensor that enabled full-time AF during video and live-view mode, and had a multi-touch vari-angle display for one-touch shooting. The DIGIC V image processor gave 5 fps of continuous shooting speed and enabled the capture of HDR images with just one click of the shutter button. The Canon 650D also came with a multi-frame NR mode and Handheld Night Scene mode. DPReview praised its innovative touchscreen, but also pointed out that with regard to auto-focussing in live view mode the 650D was "still far behind the better mirrorless models we have seen from the likes of Panasonic and Olympus as well as rival Nikon's 1 series".

See also
Canon EF lens mount
Canon EF-S lens mount, a subset of the EF mount designed for cameras with APS-C sensors such as the 600D

References

External links

Canon 600D Product Page at Canon USA

600D
Live-preview digital cameras
Cameras introduced in 2011